Daniel Hamburg (born October 6, 1948) is an American politician in Northern California who was elected as a Democratic Party Congressman in 1992, serving one term from 1993 to 1995. In 1998, he was the Green Party gubernatorial candidate in California. He remains active in the Green Party.

He had settled in Mendocino County, California after graduating from Stanford University. In Ukiah he founded an alternative school and was active for several years on the planning commission. In 1980 he was elected as a member of the Mendocino County (California) Board of Supervisors, serving to 1985. He later was elected again twice to the Board of Supervisors, in 2010 and 2014, and served two terms, from 2011 through 2018.

Early life
Hamburg was born in St. Louis, Missouri, the son of Jean (Milton) and Walter Hamburg. His family was Jewish.

He attended Stanford University and graduated in 1971. He settled in Ukiah, California, where he founded an alternative school. Hamburg also became involved in local civic affairs and served on the city planning commission from 1976 to 1981. He began to learn about local and regional land use issues. He founded a cultural study program in China.

Political career
Hamburg continued to be active in politics as a member of the Democratic Party. He was elected to the Mendocino County Board of Supervisors, serving a four-year term from 1981 to 1985.

In 1992, he was elected to California's 1st congressional district, beating Republican incumbent Frank Riggs. While in Congress, Hamburg was named one of People magazine's "50 Most Beautiful People" in 1993.

In the 1994 mid-term elections, in which Republicans made gains, Riggs defeated Hamburg in a rematch. Hamburg later became a member of the Green Party and ran as the Green Party nominee for California governor in 1998. He was the first candidate from the Green Party of California to run for governor. He finished a distant third among seven candidates with 104,117 votes, gaining 1.3% of the total vote. During the 2000 presidential election, Hamburg backed Green presidential candidate Ralph Nader.

In November 2010 Hamburg was elected for a second time to the 5th District seat on the Mendocino County Board of Supervisors. Hamburg ran unopposed for reelection in June 2014, and retired from the board in 2018.

Advocacy
Hamburg became executive director of Voice of the Environment. On December 8, 2004, he and his wife Carrie were arrested for trying to deliver a letter to Ohio Secretary of State Ken Blackwell concerning alleged voter fraud in Ohio in the 2004 U.S. presidential election.

Electoral history

Write-in and minor candidate notes:  In 1994, write-ins received 86 votes.

See also
 List of Jewish members of the United States Congress

References

External links

Dan Hamburg for Supervisor
Voice of the Environment
 

1948 births
California Greens
Living people
Democratic Party members of the United States House of Representatives from California
People from Ukiah, California
American environmentalists
Green Party of the United States politicians
Activists from California
Politicians from St. Louis
Green Party of the United States officeholders